Gaspé  may refer to:

 Gaspé, Quebec, a city in eastern Canada
 Gaspé (electoral district), a past federal electoral district of Canada
 Gaspé (provincial electoral district), a provincial electoral district in Quebec
 Gaspé Bay, a bay located on the northeast coast of the namesake peninsula
 Gaspé Peninsula, a peninsula where both the city and district are located
 Gaspésie–Îles-de-la-Madeleine, the provincial region containing the Gaspé peninsula and the Magdalen Islands
 Gaspésie—Les Îles-de-la-Madeleine, a federal electoral district

See also
 Gaspee Affair
 
 
 Gaspee Point
 Cross of Gaspé